Merihun Crespi (born 15 December 1988) is a born Ethiopian male Italian long-distance runner who won three times his country's senior national championship and an individual bronze medal at the European Athletics U20 Championships.

Biography
Born in Blaten, Ethiopia, adopted when he was 3 by Italian family. In 2009 he was azzurro at the Decanation in Paris (7th) and since 2010 he is part of the team trained by Giorgio Rondelli at the XXV Aprile field in Milan. He graduated from the Liceo Scientifico-Tecnologico, he loves music and reading: among all the champions he chooses Paul Tergat.

Achievements

National titles
He won three national championships at individual senior level.

 Italian Athletics Championships
 1500 metres: 2011, 2013
 Italian Athletics Indoor Championships
 1500 metres: 2012

See also
 Naturalized athletes of Italy

References

External links
 

1988 births
Living people
Italian male middle-distance runners
Naturalised citizens of Italy
Athletics competitors of Gruppo Sportivo Esercito